is a Prefectural Nature Park to the south of mainland Kyūshū, in Kagoshima Prefecture, Japan. Established in 1992, the park is within the municipality of Toshima.

See also
 National Parks of Japan

References

Parks and gardens in Kagoshima Prefecture
Protected areas established in 1992
1992 establishments in Japan